Seastreak is a private ferry company operating in the Port of New York and New Jersey and in New England. It provides high-speed commuter service between points on the Raritan Bayshore in Monmouth County, New Jersey and in Manhattan in New York City as well as special event and sightseeing excursions in the harbor and seasonal service to the New England coast.

History
Seastreak began operation in 1986 as TNT Hydrolines, a subsidiary of TNT of Australia operating commuter ferry services between New Jersey and New York City.

In 1994 all of TNT maritime assets were acquired by Holyman of Australia and the ferry service name was changed to Express Navigation. In 1999 Sea Containers acquired Express Navigation. The company was renamed Seastreak. Following Sea Containers filing for bankruptcy in 2006, Seastreak was sold to New England Fast Ferry in 2008.

Vessels
Seastreak operates a fleet of eight diesel-powered double-hulled catamarans. The vessels were built by Gladding-Hearn Shipbuilding of Somerset, Massachusetts.

It is used as the ferry for the seasonal Providence to Newport route. The vessel was built by Merrifield-Roberts of Bristol.

The vessels were built by Derecktor Shipyards of Mamaroneck. They operate between the Port of New Bedford and Martha's Vineyard during the summer months.

Past vessels have included the Seastreak Manhattan, the Seastreak Brooklyn, and the Seastreak Liberty, among a few others. All of these catamaran ferries were designed by Incat Crowther.

Seastreak announced construction of a 600-passenger high-speed luxury ferry in September 2016 for service between the Jersey Shore and Manhattan, anticipated to enter service in 2017. Construction took longer than planned, and the vessel, named the Commodore, was launched in March 2018, with its entry into service the following month.

The Courageous, came into service in 2021.

Routes
Seastreak routes connect the towns of Atlantic Highlands and Highlands in Monmouth County, New Jersey with Pier 11 at Wall Street and the East 34th Street Ferry Landing on the East River in Manhattan. Seastreak also connects Belford to Battery Park City Ferry Terminal  and the West Midtown Ferry Terminal on the Hudson River. During the morning rush hour the trip from the Raritan Bayshore to Manhattan takes approximately 40 minutes. 

From Memorial Day weekend through Labor Day weekend, service is also provided to the public beaches in Sandy Hook a few times each day. Service is also provided to Yankee Stadium for selected New York Yankees games and to Citi Field for New York Mets games on weekends. The company has long offered "special event cruises" such as sightseeing excursions, sunset cruises, and trips to Broadway matinees, college football games at West Point, the Macy's Fourth of July fireworks, the Macy's Thanksgiving Day Parade, and to see the fall foliage in the Hudson Valley.

On July 17, 2009, Seastreak began providing weekend service between New York City and Martha's Vineyard. One ferry departs New York City on Friday afternoon and returns on Sunday night. The trip through Long Island Sound and along the shoreline of Rhode Island and Massachusetts takes a little over five hours. The service will continue through Labor Day weekend and was implemented following the success of a trial run held over the Fourth of July weekend. Before launching its service to Martha's Vineyard, Seastreak had expressed an interest in providing a similar service on summer weekends to Sag Harbor in the Hamptons, but there were concerns over traffic and ferry service is a non-permitted use in the village code.

Hurricane Sandy service
After Hurricane Sandy in October 2012 destroyed much of the IND Rockaway Line, severing most subway service between the Rockaway peninsula of Queens, Seastreak began running a city-subsidized ferry service between a makeshift ferry slip at Beach 108th Street and Beach Channel Drive in Rockaway Park and Pier 11/Wall Street in Manhattan's Financial District, then continuing on to the East 34th Street Ferry Landing.  In August 2013, a stop was added at Brooklyn Army Terminal in advance of the temporary closure of the Montague Street Tunnel between Brooklyn and Manhattan. In December 2013, it was reported that since inception, the run between Rockaway and Manhattan had attracted an average of about 730 passengers per day, on top of the approximately 250 daily passengers traveling between Brooklyn and Manhattan. The ferry by that time had carried nearly 200,000 passengers since its inception, according to city officials.

Originally intended as a stopgap alternative transportation measure only for the months until subway service was restored at the end of May in 2013, the ferry service proved to be popular with locals, and the city's contract with Seastreak was initially extended until July 2013 and then was subsequently extended again, first till mid-October 2013 and then until January 2014. Community organizations, activists and elected officials in Rockaway and Brooklyn campaigned for a permanent extension of the subsidized service. Though full service on the Montague Street Tunnel was restored in mid-September 2014, many commuters continued to take the ferry, despite its extra $1 cost over the subway fare. In mid-October, Mayor Bill de Blasio visited Rockaway and declared that the time had come to end the ferry service, since all of the subway service that it had replaced was now back in operation. Despite efforts from other local officials, the ferry last ran on October 31, 2014, after Seastreak was unsuccessful in procuring an extension of the service. Rockaway ferry service resumed on May 1, 2017 as part of the NYC Ferry service, which is operated by Hornblower Cruises.

Accidents
In October 2003, eight passengers were evacuated to Staten Island after a fire broke out aboard a ferry heading to the Raritan Bayshore.

On January 9, 2013, at around 8:45 a.m., Seastreak Wall Street, arriving at Pier 11 from Atlantic Highlands, rammed into the mooring as it was docking, leaving a visible gash in the ferry stretching several feet above the water line. The president of the ferry company, James R. Barker, told NBC News that morning that there were 300 aboard and that many of those injured were thrown from their seats. The cause of the accident was not immediately clear. Eighty-five people were injured, two critically. According to the captain, the control system of the boat failed to respond. Lawsuits seeking damages have been brought by injured passengers. As of May 16, 2013, the deadline for filing, thirty-seven claims had been made against the company. The case will be heard in admiralty court since the accident took place on navigable waters.

On June 5, 2021, at around 4:15 p.m., the Seastreak Commodore ran aground in the Bushwick Inlet in Brooklyn. One crew member was injured, and approximately 100 passengers were evacuated.

In popular culture
The ferry is seen during a romantic moment passing underneath the Brooklyn Bridge in the movie Step Up 3D. It is seen still operating in the year 2021 in the movie Click. A ferry is also seen moving down the East River in the final shot of the 2002 film Gangs of New York, in which the Brooklyn Bridge and the World Trade Center can be seen.

In "New York Shark", an online game where a shark destroys boats and aircraft, one of the larger Seastreak vessels is featured. The vessel has Sea"Steak" written on the side.

References

External links
 

Ferry companies of New York City
Ferry companies of New Jersey
Port of New York and New Jersey
Transport companies established in 1986
American companies established in 1986
Companies that filed for Chapter 11 bankruptcy in 2006
1986 establishments in New Jersey
Atlantic Highlands, New Jersey